James Kay Thomas (February 23, 1902 – May 23, 1989) was a lawyer from Charleston who was once West Virginia Attorney General.

Early years

Washington & Lee University
Thomas was a prominent end for the Washington & Lee Generals football team of Washington & Lee University. He stood 5 feet 10 inches and weighed 160 pounds. He was selected All-Southern in 1925.

Attorney General
Thomas was West Virginia Attorney General from 1942 to 1945. Before this he served five consecutive terms in the House of Delegates.

See also
1925 College Football All-Southern Team

References

West Virginia Attorneys General
1902 births
1989 deaths
Washington and Lee Generals football players
American football ends
All-Southern college football players
Lawyers from Charleston, West Virginia
Players of American football from West Virginia
Washington and Lee Generals football coaches
Speakers of the West Virginia House of Delegates